Agape International Missions (AIM) is a nonnonprofit, non-denominational, non-governmental organization working to rescue, heal and empower survivors of sex trafficking in Cambodia. It has staff in California and Southeast Asia and carries out housing, education, health, employment, rehabilitation, and community care initiatives in Cambodia. The AIM Apparel is a retail site that sells jewelry and other products made by survivors and supports the organization's initiatives. AIM received GuideStar USA, Inc.'s gold seal of transparency in 2019. Charity Navigator gave AIM the highest rating of 4 out of 4 stars and a score of 100 out of 100 for accountability & transparency.

AIM has a SWAT team, authorized by the Cambodian government, that conducts investigations, raids brothels and indirect sex establishments (i.e. beer gardens, massage parlours, salons, karaoke bars, retail spaces, and non-commercial sites), rescues sex trafficked victims, and arrests perpetrators alongside Cambodian law enforcement. AIM also rescues girls and women sex trafficked to China.

Rescued victims are provided with support, education, employment opportunities, and more so they are well taken care of, heal from physical and psychological trauma, and do not end up in child prostitution again. 
 
AIM was founded by Bridget and Don Brewster, a former pastor of Adventure Christian Church, in California in 1989 and began operations in Cambodia in 2006. The organization opened its first shelter and restoration center for former child sex slaves in the village of Svay Pak, Cambodia.

In 2022, it was reported that AIM has assisted the Cambodian government in its controversial crack-down on surrogacy in Cambodia.

References

Organizations that combat human trafficking
Charities based in California
Foreign charities operating in Cambodia
Educational charities based in the United States
Women's rights organizations
Children's rights organizations
Christian educational organizations
Victims' rights organizations
Christian missions
Phnom Penh
Human trafficking in Cambodia
Sex worker organizations in Cambodia
Child-related organisations in Cambodia
Women's rights in Cambodia